Jayabheri Arts or Sri Jayabheri Art Productions is a film production company founded by both Murali Mohan and his brother Jayabheri Kishore Duggirala in the Telugu Film Industry. With Murali Mohan as a part of the cast, the executive and production departments were run by his brother.

The company has produced over 25 films. The company also produced Athadu in 2005 which is one of the highest-grossing Telugu films in history, and created a tremendous platform for actor Mahesh Babu.

Filmography

Producer

Distributor

References 

Film production companies of Andhra Pradesh
Film production companies based in Hyderabad, India
Year of establishment missing